Dinko Vrabac (born 28 January 1963) is a former Bosnian football player who played for several Bosnian and Slovenian clubs during the 1980s and 1990s. His brother Damir Vrabac is also a football player.

External links 

1963 births
Living people
People from Velika Kladuša
Association football forwards
Yugoslav footballers
Bosnia and Herzegovina footballers
FK Sarajevo players
NK Čelik Zenica players
NK Olimpija Ljubljana (1945–2005) players
NK Ljubljana players
NK Primorje players
Yugoslav First League players
Slovenian PrvaLiga players
Bosnia and Herzegovina expatriate footballers
Expatriate footballers in Slovenia
Bosnia and Herzegovina expatriate sportspeople in Slovenia
Bosnia and Herzegovina football managers
NK Ljubljana managers